The First Cruiser Squadron was a Royal Navy squadron of cruisers that saw service as part of the Grand Fleet during World War I, then later as part of the  Mediterranean during the Interwar period and World War II.  It was first established in 1904 and existed until 1952.

History

First formation

The squadron was formed in December 1904 when Cruiser Squadron was re-designated the 1st Cruiser Squadron. In March 1909, then consisting of battlecruisers, it was assigned to the 1st Division of the Home Fleet until April 1912. When the First World War began, the squadron was assigned to the Mediterranean Fleet where it participated in the pursuit of the German battlecruiser  and the light cruiser . It joined then Grand Fleet in January 1915 where it participated in the battles of Dogger Bank and the Battle of Jutland. It was disbanded after the battle as three of its four ships had been sunk in June 1916. It remained part of Light Cruiser Force until April 1919 when it was once again disbanded.

Rear/Vice Admiral commanding
Post holders included:

Composition, April–May 1907
As per:

Composition, First World War

August 1914
As of:
Armoured cruisers
  - Flagship of Rear-Admiral Ernest C. T. Troubridge. Captain Fawcet Wray
  - Captain Frederick D. Gilpin-Brown
  - Captain Henry Blackett
  - Captain George H. Borrett

Light cruisers

  - Captain Sidney R. Drury-Lowe
  - Captain John D. Kelly
  - Captain Howard Kelly
  - Captain William D. Church

24 January 1915
As of:
 Duke of Edinburgh - Temporary flagship of Rear-Admiral Sir Robert K. Arbuthnot
 Black Prince
 Warrior

22 February 1915
As of:
 Defence - Flagship of Rear-Admiral Sir Robert K. Arbuthnot
 Duke of Edinburgh
 Black Prince
 Warrior

30 May 1916
As of:
 Defence - Flagship of Rear-Admiral Sir Robert K. Arbuthnot
 Duke of Edinburgh
 Black Prince
 Warrior

October 1917
As of:

17 November 1917
As of:
 Courageous
 Glorious

Second formation
In October 1924 the 1st Light Cruiser Squadron is re-designated 1st Cruiser Squadron this takes effect in November 1924 and reformed as an enlarged unit of the Mediterranean Fleet under the command Rear Admiral Arthur K.Waistell.
Louis Mountbatten served as commander of the squadron in the Mediterranean Fleet and, having been granted the substantive rank of vice admiral on 22 June 1949, he became Second-in-Command of the Mediterranean Fleet in April 1950.

Rear/Vice Admiral commanding
Post holders included:

Deployments
Included:

Footnotes

References

External links

Cruiser squadrons of the Royal Navy
Military units and formations of the Royal Navy in World War I